Gruffydd Maelor II (died 1269) was Prince of Powys Fadog.

Lineage 

He was the eldest son of Prince Madog ap Gruffydd Maelor and inherited his father's lands and title in partial succession along with his four brothers Gruffydd Ial, Maredudd, Hywel and Madog Fychan. The Kingdom of Powys Fadog had previously been unified under one leader but now had five and was subjected to outside forces as well.

His father's policy of alliance with the large and powerful Gwynedd changed over his thirty-three year reign (1236-1269); pressure from Gwynedd, and Gruffydd's marriage to the daughter of an English landowner, caused him to seek support from the English king. However, support from England failed to arrive and in 1258 he was forced to submit to Llywelyn ap Gruffudd. Llywelyn was recognised as Prince of Wales under the terms of the 1267 Treaty of Montgomery and Gruffydd was confined to his castle for the rest of his life.

Marriage 

He married Emma (1224 - c. 1278), daughter of Lord Henry de Audley and Bertrade Mainwaring, members of the House of Stanley.

Death & Issue 

He died in 1269 (or 1270) leaving issue:

 Madog II, succeeded his father and was killed in battle with the English in 1277.
 Llywelyn.
 Owain, whose daughter, Gweirca ferch Owain, has the oldest dated grave slab in Wales.
 Gruffydd Fychan I succeeded his eldest brother in 1277 and died in 1289.
 Angharad d. 1308.  m (after 1261) William le Boteler of Wem, Shropshire (-1283). One of their children was William Boteler, 1st Baron Boteler (second creation).
 Margery ferch Gruffydd b. 1261 She married Sir John de Arderne.

Powys Fadog was divided, in accordance with Welsh custom, between his sons:
 Madog received Maelor.
 Gruffudd had Iâl (Yale) and Edeirnion, which included Glyndyfrdwy.
 Swydd y Waun (containing the commotes of Cynllaith and Nanheudwy) was divided between Llywelyn and Owain.

References
 Medieval Lands Project on the Princes of Northern Powys

1236 births
1269 deaths
Monarchs of Powys
13th-century Welsh monarchs